Suzanne Dalbert (12 May 1927 – 31 December 1970) was a French actress who appeared in a number of American films and television series during the 1940s and 50s.

Biography
Dalbert was born in Paris and moved to the United States, following World War II. She was discovered by the Paramount studio head Hal Wallis who hoped to develop her into a major star. She was cast in a supporting role in The Accused but was left demoralized at her treatment by the overbearing director William Dieterle.

Dalbert did not develop as a leading star but appeared in a mixture of small roles in larger-budget films while playing the female lead in B Pictures, such as Trail of the Yukon (1949). In 1949, she participated in a later famous Life magazine photo layout, in which she posed with other up-and-coming actresses, Marilyn Monroe, Lois Maxwell, Cathy Downs, Enrica Soma, Laurette Luez and Jane Nigh. From 1951 onwards, she appeared mostly in television before retiring in 1957 and returning to her native France.

Death
Suzanne Dalbert died 31 December 1970 at age 43 from suicide by overdose.

Filmography

References

Bibliography
 Dick, Bernard F. Hal Wallis: Producer to the Stars. University Press of Kentucky, 2004.

External links
 

1927 births
1970 deaths
French television actresses
French film actresses
Actresses from Paris
20th-century French actresses
1970 suicides
French expatriate actresses in the United States
Suicides in France